Ceretto Lomellina is a comune (municipality) in the Province of Pavia in the Italian region Lombardy, located about 45 km southwest of Milan and about 40 km west of Pavia. As of 31 December 2004, it had a population of 228 and an area of 7.4 km².

Ceretto Lomellina borders the following municipalities: Castello d'Agogna, Castelnovetto, Mortara, Nicorvo, Sant'Angelo Lomellina.

Demographic evolution

References

Cities and towns in Lombardy